The Macon Open was a golf tournament on the Nike Tour. It ran from 1990 to 1995. It was played at River North Country Club in Macon, Georgia.

In 1995 the winner earned $36,000.

Winners

External links
Macon Open tournament results from GolfObserver.com - Final scores and earnings of each event played from 1990 to 1995

Former Korn Ferry Tour events
Golf in Georgia (U.S. state)
Recurring sporting events established in 1990
Recurring sporting events disestablished in 1995